The R515 is a Regional Route in South Africa.

Route
It is a north-south route. Its northern terminus is the R513 in Cullinan. Heading south, it passes through Rayton, crosses the R104, and N4 before ending at a t-junction with the R25, midway between Bapsfontein and Bronkhorstspruit.

References

Regional Routes in Gauteng